

See also
 Lists of fossiliferous stratigraphic units in Africa

References
 

Kenya
 
 
Fossiliferous stratigraphic units
Fossil